In America: An Anthology of Fashion is the 2022 high fashion art exhibition of the Anna Wintour Costume Center, a wing of the Metropolitan Museum of Art (MMA) which houses the collection of the Costume Institute. It is the piece of a two-part exhibit that explores fashion in the United States. This exhibit highlights stylistic narratives and histories of the American Wing Period. Each immersive period rooms reflect America from the 1700s to the 1970s and captures men's and women's fashion. The rooms also display America's domestic life and the influences of cultures, politics, and style at each period.

References

Metropolitan Museum of Art exhibitions
2022 in art
2022 in fashion